Goliath is a character in the Book of Samuel, described as a Philistine giant defeated by the young David in single combat. The story signified King Saul's unfitness to rule, as Saul himself should have fought for Israel. Scholars today believe that the original listed killer of Goliath was Elhanan, son of Jair, and that the authors of the Deuteronomic history changed the original text to credit the victory to the more famous character David.  

The phrase "David and Goliath" has taken on a more popular meaning denoting an underdog situation, a contest wherein a smaller, weaker opponent faces a much bigger, stronger adversary.

Biblical account

The Goliath narrative in 1 Samuel 17

Saul and the Israelites are facing the Philistines in the Valley of Elah. Twice a day for 40 days, morning and evening, Goliath, the champion of the Philistines, comes out between the lines and challenges the Israelites to send out a champion of their own to decide the outcome in single combat, but Saul is afraid. David accepts the challenge. Saul reluctantly agrees and offers his armor, which David declines, taking only his staff, sling, and five stones from a brook.

David and Goliath confront each other, Goliath with his armor and javelin, David with his staff and sling. "The Philistine cursed David by his gods", but David replies: "This day the Lord will deliver you into my hand, and I will strike you down, and I will give the dead bodies of the host of the Philistines this day to the birds of the air and to the wild beasts of the earth; that all the earth may know that there is a god in Israel and that all this assembly may know that God saves not with sword and spear; for the battle is God's, and he will give you into our hand."

David hurls a stone from his sling and hits Goliath in the center of his forehead, Goliath falls on his face to the ground, and David cuts off his head. The Philistines flee and are pursued by the Israelites "as far as Gath and the gates of Ekron". David puts the armor of Goliath in his own tent and takes the head to Jerusalem, and Saul sends Abner to bring the boy to him. The king asks whose son he is, and David answers, "I am the son of your servant Jesse the Bethlehemite."

Composition of the Book of Samuel
The Books of Samuel, together with the books of Joshua, Judges and Kings, make up a unified history of Israel which biblical scholars call the Deuteronomistic History. The first edition of the history was probably written at the court of Judah's King Josiah (late 7th century BCE) and a revised second edition during the exile (6th century BCE), with further revisions in the post-exilic period.  Traces of this can be seen in contradictions within the Goliath story, such as that between 1 Samuel 17:54, which says that David took Goliath's head to Jerusalem, although according to 2 Samuel 5 Jerusalem at that time was still a Jebusite stronghold and was not captured until David became king.

Structure of the Goliath narrative
The Goliath story is made up of base-narrative with numerous additions made probably after the exile:

 Original story
 The Israelites and Philistines face each other; Goliath makes his challenge to single combat;
 David volunteers to fight Goliath;
 David selects five smooth stones from a creek-bed to be used in his sling;
 David defeats Goliath, the Philistines flee the battlefield.

Additions
 David is sent by his father to bring food to his brothers, hears the challenge, and expresses his desire to accept; 
 Details of the account of the battle;
 Saul asks who David is, and he is introduced to the king through Abner.

Textual considerations

Goliath's height

The oldest manuscripts, namely the Dead Sea Scrolls text of Samuel from the late 1st century BCE, the 1st-century CE historian Josephus, and the major Septuagint manuscripts, all give Goliath's height as "four cubits and a span", whereas the Masoretic Text has "six cubits and a span". Many scholars have suggested that the smaller number grew in the course of transmission (only a few have suggested the reverse, that an original larger number was reduced), possibly when a scribe's eye was drawn to the number six in line 17:7.

Goliath and Saul
The underlying purpose of the story of Goliath is to show that Saul is not fit to be king (and that David is). Also, Saul's armor and weaponry are apparently no worse than Goliath's. "David declares that when a lion or bear came and attacked his father's sheep, he battled against it and killed it, [but Saul] has been cowering in fear instead of rising up and attacking the threat to his sheep (i.e., Israel)." David's speech in 1 Sam 17 can be interpreted as referring to both Saul and Goliath through its animal imagery. When this imagery is considered closely, David can be seen to function as the true king who manipulates wild beasts.

Elhanan and Goliath
2 Samuel 21:19 tells how Goliath the Gittite was killed by "Elhanan the son of Jaare-oregim, the Bethlehemite." Scholars believe that the original killer of Goliath was Elhanan and that the authors of the Deutoronomic history changed the text to credit the victory to the more famous character David. The fourth-century BC 1 Chronicle 20:5 explains the second Goliath by saying that Elhanan "slew Lahmi the brother of Goliath", constructing the name Lahmi from the last portion of the word "Bethlehemite" ("beit-ha’lahmi"), and the King James Bible adopted this into 2 Samuel 21:18–19, but the Hebrew text at Goliath's name makes no mention of the word "brother".

"Most scholars dismiss the parallel in 1 Chronicles 20:5 as an obvious harmonization". "Halpern represents perhaps a majority of current scholars".

Goliath and the Greeks
The armor described in 1 Samuel 17 appears typical of Greek armor of the sixth century BCE rather than of Philistine armor of the tenth century BCE; narrative formulae such as the settlement of battle by single combat between champions has been thought characteristic of the Homeric epics (the Iliad) rather than of the ancient Near East.

A story very similar to that of David and Goliath appears in the Iliad, written circa 760–710 BCE, where the young Nestor fights and conquers the giant Ereuthalion. Each giant wields a distinctive weapon—an iron club in Ereuthalion's case, a massive bronze spear in Goliath's; each giant, clad in armor, comes out of the enemy's massed array to challenge all the warriors in the opposing army; in each case the seasoned warriors are afraid, and the challenge is taken up by a stripling, the youngest in his family (Nestor is the twelfth son of Neleus, David the seventh or eighth son of Jesse). In each case an older and more experienced father figure (Nestor's own father, David's patron Saul) tells the boy that he is too young and inexperienced, but in each case the young hero receives divine aid and the giant is left sprawling on the ground. Nestor, fighting on foot, then takes the chariot of his enemy, while David, on foot, takes the sword of Goliath. The enemy army then flees, the victors pursue and slaughter them and return with their bodies, and the boy-hero is acclaimed by the people.

Goliath's name
Tell es-Safi, the biblical Gath and traditional home of Goliath, has been the subject of extensive excavations by Israel's Bar-Ilan University. The archaeologists have established that this was one of the largest of the Philistine cities until destroyed in the ninth century BC, an event from which it never recovered.

The Tell es-Safi inscription, a potsherd discovered at the site, and reliably dated to between the tenth to mid-ninth centuries BC, is inscribed with the two names ʾLWT and WLT. While the names are not directly connected with the biblical Goliath (GLYT), they are etymologically related and demonstrate that the name fits with the context of the late tenth- to early ninth-century BC Philistine culture. The name "Goliath" itself is non-Semitic and has been linked with the Lydian king Alyattes, which also fits the Philistine context of the biblical Goliath story. A similar name, Uliat, is also attested in Carian inscriptions. Aren Maeir, director of the excavation, comments: "Here we have very nice evidence [that] the name Goliath appearing in the Bible in the context of the story of David and Goliath… is not some later literary creation."

Based on the southwest Anatolian onomastic considerations, Roger D. Woodard proposed *Walwatta as a reconstruction of the form ancestral to both Hebrew Goliath and Lydian Alyattes. In this case, the original meaning of Goliath's name would be "Lion-man," thus placing him within the realm of Indo-European warrior-beast mythology. Other Indo-European parallels then would be Germanic bear-warriors (berserkers), the lion-warrior Heracles, werewolves, and related traditions describing battle rage as beastlike behavior. Woodard notes that the author of 1 Samuel was most likely not aware of the broader Indo-European mythological context but may draw upon an oral tradition linking Goliath with the lion; hence David's mention of killing the lion and bear and Goliath's question: "Am I a dog, that you come to me with sticks?"

Later traditions

Jewish
 
According to the Babylonian Talmud (Sotah 42b) Goliath was a son of Orpah, the sister-in-law of Ruth, David's own great grandmother (Ruth → Obed → Jesse → David). Ruth Rabbah, a haggadic and homiletic interpretation of the Book of Ruth, makes the blood-relationship even closer, considering Orpah and Ruth to have been full sisters. Orpah was said to have made a pretense of accompanying Ruth but after forty paces left her. Thereafter she led a dissolute life. According to the Jerusalem Talmud, Goliath was born by polyspermy, and had about one hundred fathers.

The Talmud stresses Goliath's ungodliness: his taunts before the Israelites included the boast that it was he who had captured the Ark of the Covenant and brought it to the temple of Dagon, and his challenges to combat were made at morning and evening in order to disturb the Israelites in their prayers. His armor weighed 60 tons, according to rabbi Hanina; 120, according to rabbi Abba bar Kahana; and his sword, which became the sword of David, had marvelous powers. On his death it was found that his heart carried the image of Dagon, who thereby also came to a shameful downfall.

In Pseudo-Philo, believed to have been composed between 135 BC and 70 AD, David picks up seven stones and writes on them his father's name, his own name, and the name of God, one name per stone; then, speaking to Goliath, he says "Hear this word before you die: were not the two woman from whom you and I were born, sisters? And your mother was Orpah and my mother Ruth ..." After David strikes Goliath with the stone he runs to Goliath before he dies and Goliath says "Hurry and kill me and rejoice." and David replies "Before you die, open your eyes and see your slayer." Goliath sees an angel and tells David that it is not he who has killed him but the angel. Pseudo-Philo then goes on to say that the angel of the Lord changes David's appearance so that no one recognizes him, and thus Saul asks who he is.

Islam
Goliath appears in chapter 2 of the Quran (2: 247–252), in the narrative of David and Saul's battle against the Philistines. Called  in Arabic, Goliath's mention in the Quran is concise, although it remains a parallel to the account in the Hebrew Bible. Muslim scholars have tried to trace Goliath's origins, most commonly with the Amalekites. Goliath, in early scholarly tradition, became a kind of byword or collective name for the oppressors of the Israelite nation before David. Muslim tradition sees the battle with Goliath as a prefiguration of Muhammad's battle of Badr, and sees Goliath as parallel to the enemies that Muhammad faced.

Modern usage of "David and Goliath"

In modern usage, the phrase "David and Goliath" has taken on a secular meaning, denoting an underdog situation, a contest where a smaller, weaker opponent faces a much bigger, stronger adversary; if successful, the underdog may win in an unusual or surprising  way.

Theology professor Leonard Greenspoon, in his essay, "David vs. Goliath in the Sports Pages", explains that "most writers use the story for its underdog overtones (the little guy wins) ... Less likely to show up in newsprint is the contrast that was most important to the biblical authors: David's victory shows the power of his God, while Goliath's defeat reveals the weakness of the Philistine deities."

The phrase is widely used in news media to succinctly characterize underdog situations in many contexts without religious overtones. Contemporary headlines include: sports ("Haye relishes underdog role in 'David and Goliath' fight with Nikolai Valuev"—The Guardian); business ("On Internet, David-and-Goliath Battle Over Instant Messages"—The New York Times); science ("David and Goliath: How a tiny spider catches much larger prey"—ScienceDaily; politics ("Dissent in Cuba: David and Goliath"—The Economist); social justice ("David-and-Goliath Saga Brings Cable to Skid Row"—Los Angeles Times).

Aside from the above allegorical use of "David and Goliath", there is also the use of "Goliath" for a particularly tall person. For example, basketball player Wilt Chamberlain was nicknamed "Goliath", which he disliked.

In popular culture

American actor Ted Cassidy portrayed Goliath in the TV series Greatest Heroes of the Bible in 1978. Italian actor Luigi Montefiori portrayed this -tall giant in Paramount's 1985 live-action film King David as part of a flashback. This film includes the King of the Philistines saying, "Goliath has challenged the Israelites six times and no one has responded." It is then on the seventh time that David meets his challenge.

In 1972, Toho and Tsuburaya Productions collaborated on a film called Daigoro vs. Goliath, which follows the story relatively closely but recasts the main characters as kaiju.

In 2005, Lightstone Studios released a direct-to-DVD movie musical titled "One Smooth Stone", which was later changed to "David and Goliath". It is part of the Liken the Scriptures (now just Liken) series of movie musicals on DVD based on scripture stories. Thurl Bailey, a former NBA basketball player, was cast to play the part of Goliath in this film.

In 2009, NBC aired Kings which has a narrative loosely based on the biblical story of King David, but set in a kingdom that culturally and technologically resembles the present-day United States. The part of Goliath is portrayed by a tank, which David destroys with a shoulder fired rocket launcher.

Italian Goliath film series (1960–1964)
The Italians used Goliath as an action superhero in a series of biblical adventure films (peplums) in the early 1960s. He possessed amazing strength, and the films were similar in theme to their Hercules and Maciste movies. After the classic Hercules (1958) became a blockbuster sensation in the film industry, the 1959 Steve Reeves film Terrore dei Barbari (Terror of the Barbarians) was retitled Goliath and the Barbarians in the United States, (after Joseph E. Levine claimed the sole right to the name of Hercules); the film was so successful at the box office, it inspired Italian filmmakers to do a series of four more films featuring a beefcake hero named Goliath, although the films were not really related to each other. (The 1960 Italian film David and Goliath starring Orson Welles was not one of these, since that film was a straightforward adaptation of the biblical story).

The four titles in the Italian Goliath series were as follows:
 
 Goliath contro i giganti/Goliath Against the Giants (1960) starring Brad Harris
 Goliath e la schiava ribelle/Goliath and the Rebel Slave (a.k.a. The Tyrant of Lydia vs. The Son of Hercules) (1963) starring Gordon Scott
 Golia e il cavaliere mascherato/Goliath and the Masked Rider (a.k.a. Hercules and the Masked Rider)  (1964) starring Alan Steel
 Golia alla conquista di Bagdad/Goliath at the Conquest of Baghdad (a.k.a. Goliath at the Conquest of Damascus, 1964) starring Peter Lupus

The name Goliath was later inserted into the film titles of three other Italian muscle man movies that were retitled for distribution in the United States in an attempt to cash in on the Goliath craze, but these films were not originally made as Goliath films in Italy.

Both Goliath and the Vampires (1961) and Goliath and the Sins of Babylon (1963) actually featured the famed superhero Maciste in the original Italian versions, but American distributors did not feel the name Maciste had any meaning to American audiences. Goliath and the Dragon (1960) was originally an Italian Hercules film called The Revenge of Hercules.

See also 
 Og
 An Army of Davids
 Battle of Ain Jalut ("Battle of Goliath Well")
 Gilgamesh
 List of tallest people
 David Plates
 Survivor: David vs. Goliath, the 37th season of American Survivor, which utilizes the David and Goliath theme.

Notes

References

Citations

Bibliography

External links 
 

 
Books of Samuel people
People associated with David
Deaths by decapitation
Giants in Islam
Giants in the Hebrew Bible
Military personnel killed in action
Philistines
Warriors of Asia
Gath (city)